Whitley Warriors are an ice hockey team based in Whitley Bay in the north east of England. Founded in 1957 as the Bees, they changed their name to Whitley Warriors in 1964. Warriors played at the highest level of British ice hockey for much of their history but currently play in the third tier, National Ice Hockey League North Division 1.

Their home arena is Whitley Bay Ice Rink.

Club roster 2022-23
(*) Denotes a Non-British Trained player (Import)

2021/22 Outgoing

Honours
British Championship:
Winners  –  1972/73, 1973/74

English National League Championship:
Winners – 1999/2000, 2000/01, 2001/02, 2007/08

English National League:
Runners-up  –  1997/98

Northern League:
Winners  –  1973/74, 1974/75
Runners-up  –  1976/77, 1977/78, 2006/07, 2010/11

Northern League Play-offs:
Winners: 2006/07
Runners-up  –  1967/68, 1976/77

English National League North:
Winners  –  2001/02, 2009/10, 2010/11
Runners-up  –  1997/98, 1999/00, 2000/01, 2006/07, 2007/08

English Cup:
Winners  –  2001/02
Runners-up  –  2000/01

Anglo Scottish Cup:
Winners  –  2000/01

Scottish Cup:
Winners  –  1991/92,
Runners-up  –  1992/93

Heineken British Premier League:
Runners-up  –  1987/88

Benson & Hedges Cup:
Runners-up  –  1992/93

Autumn Cup:
Winners  –  1971/72
Runners-up  –  1972/73, 1974/75, 1976/77

BIHA Cup:
Winners  –  1957/58, 1958/59 (as Whitley Bees)

NIHL North Cup:
Runners-up  –  2019/20
Runners-up  –  2021/22

NIHL North Division 1 Moralee:
Winners - 2019/20
Runners-up  –  2021/22

Ice Hockey Journalists UK Hall of Fame:
Terry Matthews (1987), Alfie Miller (1988), J.J. 'Icy' Smith (1988), Hilton Ruggles (2009), David Longstaff (2022)

Junior teams
The Warriors have numerous junior teams, with most bearing names that are considered derogatory and racist, especially when used contemporarily by non-indigenous people.
The teams are:
 Under 9 - Mischiefs
 Under 11 - Arrows
 Under 13 - Mohawks
 Under 15 - Tomahawks
 Under 18 - Braves
 Under 20 - Renegades
 Ladies - Beacons

Imports
 1969-70 Dave Marsden
 1975–1976 Don McAdams
 1977–1978 Jan Pettersson & Harri Semi.
 1978–1979 Brian Labatte
 1979–1980 Lars Opsahl
 1980–1981 Lars Opsahl
 1981–1982 Buzz Brown
 1982–1983 Tim Whitehead
 1983–1984 Ron Butler, Al Kent & Kel Land
 1984–1985 Pete Fitzpatrick, Hugh Alcorn & Roy Wallace
 1985–1986 Peter Dunkley, Brian Mason, Steve Attwell & Bill Audycki
 1986–1987 Jim Earle, Tom Earle & Bruce Stanley
 1987–1988 Scott Morrison, Luc Chabot & Mike Babcock
 1988–1989 Scott Morrison, Hilton Ruggles & Mike Rowe
 1989–1990 Hilton Ruggles, Marc Damphousse, Claude Lefebvre, Wayne Crawford, Chris Duperron, Marco Ronkko, Mike Vellucci & James Gasseau
 1990–1991 Hilton Ruggles, Claude Dumas, Brad Hyatt, Daryl Evans, Steve Chartrand & Blaine Peerless
 1991–1992 Hilton Ruggles, Claude Dumas, Mike Rowe, Rob Abel & Bobby Brown
 1992–1993 Claude Dumas, Scott Morrison, Mike Rowe, Mike Mowbray & Steve Brown
 1993–1994 Scott Morrison, Steve Brown, Tyler Larter, Mike Rowe, Eric LeGros
 1994–1995 Steve Brown, Dean Richards, Brian Verbeek, Mike Rowe, Martin St. Amour
 1995–1996 (as Newcastle Warriors) Steve Brown, Chris Norton, Richard Laplante, Jason Smart, Dean Richards, Scott Morrison, Rick Fera, Scott Campbell, Lars Thunnell, Niklas Gullikson, Risto Halenius, Tim Salmon
 1996–1997 Matthew Beveridge, Stefan Simoes, Mark Stokes, Matt McGuffin, Grant Morrow
 1997–1998 Timo Loucasvuori, Kimmo Saarinen, Seppo Rajpar, Sami Rajpar
 1998–1999 Trond Gundersen
 1999–2000 Trond Gundersen
 2000–2001 Fredrik Jonsson, Lauri Oksanen
 2005–2006 Hakan Andersson
 2008–2009 Peter Tomek
 2015–2016 Andre Payette
 2016–2017 Andre Payette
 2017–2018 Philip Edgar
 2018–2019 Rolands Gritāns, Philip Edgar
 2019–2020 Rolands Gritāns, Philip Edgar
2021-2022 Rolands Gritāns, Rihards Grigors, Matěj Valíček

Retired jerseys
Alfie Miller (#10) is the only jersey that has been retired for the Warriors.

Logo 
Despite the Warriors' logo depicting a Native American (the logo and colours being "inspired" by the Washington Redskins) and the associated controversy which resulted in the Redskins removing their logo on the grounds that it was considered racist, there has been no similar discussion around the Warriors'. Teams like Frölunda Indians HC and Chicago Blackhawks which have similar logos have come under significant pressure to change their logos on similar grounds. Frolunda announced that they would no longer be called the Indians and would be changing their logo.

References

External links
 Official Website

Ice hockey teams in England
Sport in Tyne and Wear
Whitley Bay